Porto Recanati is a town with some 12,500 inhabitants in the province of Macerata, in the Marche region. of central Italy. It is the northeast coastal town of the province. It was made an independent town on 15 January 1893, when, due to a Decree signed by King Umberto I of Italy, Porto Recanati's coastal hamlets were separated from Recanati.

The communal territory is completely plain, and it is located near the Mount Conero. The town's seabord, defined north by the mouth of Musone river, extends itself for about two km south, beyond the mouth of Potenza river. The central part of Porto Recanati's  is basically formed by gravel beaches and steep sea with deep bottom also a few steps from sea shore, unlike nearby towns Potenza Picena and Civitanova Marche.

History 
The area seem to have been inhabited since Bronze Age, as  findings on the top of Montarice's hill, hailing from period called Apennine Medium Bronze and  dating from the 15th-14th centuries BC have confirmed. In the same areas fragments of the 6th century BC Attic pottery have been recovered,  witnessing the early commercial trade in the area.

Main sights 
The Castello Svevo (Hohenstaufen Castle), built during the 13th through 15th centuries as a rampart against Turkish pirates attacks, is home to the Municipal Art Gallery, that in nine rooms collects paintings, mainly from 1850 to the early 20th century.

Among its churches is the parish church of San Giovanni Battista, and the small chapel of Chiesetta della Banderuola.

Tourism 
Porto Recanati is home to a large number of family-run restaurants and shops that cater to the tourism industry. Porto Recanati serves a spring-summer tourist town, with a beach and an annual Aeronautica Militare airshow.

Porto Recanati's restaurants offer a large selection of locally caught seafood including lobster, sea bass and calamari. A local specialty is the brodetto di Porto Recanati, a traditional fisherman's dish. The town also features a large fish market located on the outskirts of town.

Twin towns 
  Kronberg im Taunus, Germany
  Mar del Plata, Argentina

References